The Project 651, known in the West by its NATO reporting name Juliett class, was a class of Soviet diesel-electric submarines armed with cruise missiles. They were designed in the late 1950s to provide the Soviet Navy with a nuclear strike capability against targets along the east coast of the United States and enemy combatants (aircraft carriers). The head of the design team was Abram Samuilovich Kassatsier. Once surfaced, the first missile could be launched in about five minutes; subsequent missiles would follow within about ten seconds each. Initially, the missiles were the inertially-guided P-5 (NATO reporting name SS-N-3c Shaddock). When submarine-launched ballistic missiles rendered the P-5s obsolescent, they were replaced with the P-6 (also NATO reporting name SS-N-3a Shaddock, though a very different missile) designed to attack aircraft carriers. A special 10 m2 target guidance radar was built into the forward edge of the sail structure, which opened by rotating. One boat was eventually fitted with the Kasatka satellite downlink for targeting information to support P-500 4K-80 "Bazalt" (SS-N-12 Sandbox) anti-ship cruise missiles.

Background and description
In the late 1950s, the Soviet Navy was tasked to neutralize American bases and aircraft carriers. It began construction of a large number of expensive nuclear-powered (s) to accomplish this, but could not build enough nuclear reactors to equip them in a timely manner. Even though the Juliett class was inferior to the Echos, it was ordered into production because it did not require resources needed for the nuclear boats.

The Juliett-class boats are a double-hulled design that displaces  on the surface and  submerged. The prominent blast deflectors cut out of the outer hull behind the missile launchers make the submarines very noisy at high speed. Their crew numbered 78 men.

Propulsion and performance
The Juliett class is powered by a diesel-electric system that consists of two  1D43 diesel engines and a pair of  MG-141 electric motors for cruising on the surface. Two additional  electric motors are intended for slow speeds underwater and are powered by four banks of lead-acid battery cells that are recharged by a  1DL42 diesel generator. The boats are fitted with a retractable snorkel to allow the diesel engines to operate while underwater.

They could carry enough supplies for 90 days of operation.

Armament
To carry out the Julietts' mission of destroying American carrier battle groups and bases, they were fitted with two pairs of missile launchers, one each fore and aft of the sail. The launchers were used by the surface-launched SS-N-3 Shaddock family of long-range, turbojet-powered, cruise missiles. The P-5D version was codenamed SS-N-3c by NATO and was a dedicated land-attack missile that could be equipped with either a high-explosive or nuclear warhead; it was withdrawn from service in 1965–1966. The P-6 (SS-N-3a) variant was a radar-guided anti-ship missile that could also be fitted with high-explosive and nuclear warheads.
 
The more traditional armament of the Julietts consisted of six  torpedo tubes mounted in the bow and four  torpedo tubes in the stern. Due to space limitations, no reloads were provided for the bow tubes, but each stern tube had two reloads for a total of twelve.

Fire control and sensors

The submarines relied upon aircraft for their long-range anti-ship targeting which they received via the Uspekh-U datalink system. Their own Argument missile-guidance radar (NATO reporting name: Front Door) controlled the P-6 missiles until they were out of range via a datalink codenamed Front Piece. The missiles' onboard radar would detect the targets and transmit an image back to the submarine via video datalink so the crew could select which target to attack, after which the missile relied upon its own radar for terminal guidance. The Argument radar has a massive antenna that was stowed at the front of the sail and rotated 180° for use. The Front Piece antenna was mounted on top of the Argument antenna.

The boats are fitted with Artika-M (MG-200) and Herkules (MG-15) sonars, Feniks-M (MG-10) and MG-13 hydrophones and an Albatros RLK-50 search radar (NATO reporting name: Snoop Tray). They are also equipped with a Nakat-M Electronic warfare support measures system.

Initial plans called for 35 submarines of this class. In fact only 16 were actually built, two - including the lead sub, by the Baltic Shipyard, St. Petersburg and the rest by the Krasnoye Sormovo Shipyard in Nizhny Novgorod. They were commissioned between 1963 and 1968, and served through the 1980s. The last one was decommissioned in 1994.

The Juliett class was built due to expected delays in the continued production of the nuclear-powered Project 659 s and 675 s, with six and eight missile launchers, respectively. The Julietts were actually designed after the Echos.

Units

References

Bibliography

External links 

article in English from FAS
Article in Russian

 
 
Russian and Soviet navy submarine classes
Submarine classes